Jesús Carroza Rodríguez (born in Sevilla, 7 November 1987), is a Spanish actor, winner of the 2006 Best New Actor Goya award for his role as Richi on the movie 7 Virgins.

Biography 
Jesus Carroza was born in Sevilla, Spain in 1987, the youngest of 4 siblings. At 16 he attended a casting that took place in his high school, and was chosen from more than 3000 applicants to land his role as Richi in 7 Virgins, the movie that started his acting career and for which he won the Best New Actor Goya award in 2006.

Filmography

Television

Film

Accolades

References

External links 
 

1987 births
Living people
21st-century Spanish male actors
Spanish male film actors
Spanish male television actors